The 2005 IIHF World U18 Championship Division II was a pair of international under-18 ice hockey tournaments run by the International Ice Hockey Federation. The Division II tournaments made up the third level of competition at the 2005 IIHF World U18 Championships. The Group A tournament took place between 14 and 20 March 2005 in Kohtla-Järve, Estonia and the Group B tournament took place between 21 and 27 March 2004 in Bucharest, Romania. South Korea and Hungary won the Group A and Group B tournaments respectively and gained promotion to Division I for the 2006 IIHF World U18 Championships. While South Africa finished last in Group A and Romania last in Group B and were both relegated to Division III for 2006.

Group A tournament
The Group A tournament began on 14 March 2005 in Kohtla-Järve, Estonia. Estonia, the Netherlands, Serbia and Montenegro and Spain returned to compete in the Division II competition after missing promotion at the previous years World Championships. South Korea entered the Division II competition after being relegated from Division I and South Africa entered the tournament after gaining promotion from Division III at the 2004 IIHF World U18 Championships.

South Korea won the tournament after winning all five of their games and gained promotion back to Division I for the 2006 IIHF World U18 Championships. Estonia finished in second place, losing only to South Korea and the Netherlands finished in third. South Africa finished in last place after losing all five of their games and were relegated back to Division III for the 2006 IIHF World U18 Championships. Cho Min Ho of South Korea finished as the top scorer of the tournament with 20 points including 12 goals and eight assists. South Korea's Kim Dong Wook finished as the tournaments leading goaltender with a save percentage of 95.41.

Standings

Fixtures
All times local.

Scoring leaders
List shows the top ten ranked skaters sorted by points, then goals.

Leading goaltenders
Only the top five goaltenders, based on save percentage, who have played 40% of their team's minutes are included in this list.

Group B tournament
The Group B tournament began on 21 March 2005 in Bucharest, Romania. Croatia, Hungary, Iceland and Lithuania all returned to compete in the Division II tournament after missing promotion to Division I at the previous years World Championship. Romania entered the Division II competition after being relegated from Division I and Mexico entered the tournament after gaining promotion from Division III at the 2004 IIHF World U18 Championships.

Hungary won the tournament after winning all five of their games and gained promotion to Division I for the 2006 IIHF World U18 Championships. Lithuania finished second after losing only to Hungary  and Croatia finished in third place. Romania finished in last place after losing four of their five games and finishing last in the group standings and were relegated to Division III for the 2006 IIHF World U18 Championships. Donatas Kumeliauskas of Lithuania finished as the top scorer of the tournament with 16 points including eight goals and eight assists. Hungary's Tamas Gyomber finished as the tournaments leading goaltender with a save percentage of 91.11.

Standings

Fixtures
All times local.

Scoring leaders
List shows the top ten ranked skaters sorted by points, then goals.

Leading goaltenders
Only the top five goaltenders, based on save percentage, who have played at least 40% of their team's minutes are included in this list.

References

IIHF
IIHF World U18 Championship Division II
II
International ice hockey competitions hosted by Estonia
International ice hockey competitions hosted by Romania
IIHF World U18 Championship Division II